Scarborough Junction (also known as Kennedy Park) is a small neighbourhood in the Scarborough district of Toronto, Ontario, Canada. It is bordered by Birchmount Road, Brimley Road, Eglinton Avenue, and St. Clair Avenue.
Scarbrough Junction has an approximated population of 20,000. The population consists of 1/4 Caucasian, 2/4 Asian (South and East) and 1/4 other (Black, Latino, etc.)

History

The first European settlement in the area was the town of Strangford established at what is today the intersection of Victoria Park and St. Clair in 1863. Another small town named Mortlake was established in 1865. The town's main building, the Halfway House Hotel, survives today at Black Creek Pioneer Village where it was moved in 1962. The small farming communities changed when the area became the meeting point of two major railways. The Grand Trunk Railway laid track through the area in 1856 and the Toronto and Nipissing Railway arrived in 1873. The business of the area changed from farming to supporting travellers and maintaining the railroads. The two towns, Strangford and Mortlake, merged into Scarborough Junction. By 1896 Scarborough Junction became the most populated of all the villages in the Township of Scarborough.

The post-World War II years saw Scarborough Junction become one of the first areas of Scarborough to be transformed into modern suburbs. Its major road and rail lines made for easy travel to the city, inspiring the epithet "Scarborough Junction." It is actually named for the junction of two early railways: The Grand Trunk and the Toronto-Nipissing.

Education

Two public school boards operate schools in Scarborough Junction, the separate Toronto Catholic District School Board (TCDSB), and the secular Toronto District School Board (TDSB).

Both TCDSB, and TDSB operate public elementary schools in the neighbourhood. TCDSB operates two elementary schools, St. Joachim Catholic School, and St. Maria Goretti Catholic School. St. Maria Goretti is the largest Catholic elementary school in Toronto. It opened in 1955, and is named after Maria Goretti. It boasts a double gymnasium with a stage, closed circuit television in every classroom, an elevator and an assembly area named the "Ark'" which can be used for gatherings of up to 300 people.

TDSB several elementary schools in the neighbourhood. They include:

 Corvette Junior Public School
 Danforth Gardens Public School
 General Brock Public School
 J. G. Workman Public School
 Norman Cook Junior Public School
 Robert Service Senior Public School
 Walter Perry Junior Public School

TDSB is the public school board to operate a secondary institution in Scarborough Junction, Scarborough Centre for Alternative Studies. The institution operates as an alternative and adult school. The institution formerly operated as Midland Avenue Collegiate Institute, a TDSB secondary school that featured modernist designs such as a circular cafeteria.. The secondary school operated from 1962 to 2000.

TCDSB does not operate a secondary school in the area, with TCDSB secondary school students residing in Scarborough Junction attending institutions in adjacent neighbourhoods. The French first language public secular school board, Conseil scolaire Viamonde, and it separate counterpart, Conseil scolaire catholique MonAvenir also offer schooling to applicable residents of Scarborough Junction, although they do not operate a school in the neighbourhood, with CSCM/CSV students attending schools situated in other neighbourhoods in Toronto.

References 

 Scarborough Historical Society - Scarborough Junction  (Strangford & Mortlake)

External links 
 

Neighbourhoods in Toronto
Scarborough, Toronto
Rail junctions in Ontario